Bailando 2016 is the eleventh season of Bailando por un Sueño. The season premiere aired on 30 May 2016, on El Trece. However, the competition started a day later, on 31 May. Marcelo Tinelli, once again, was the host for the show's.

On 19 December 2016, theatre producer & actor Pedro Alfonso and reality TV star Florencia Vigna were announced winners. Singer Ezequiel Cwirkaluk and dancer & TV personality Bárbara Silenzi finished second.

Cast

Teams 
Initially, 26 teams were confirmed. This season 5 couples made up of celebrities participate, they are: Federico Bal & Laura Fernández (winners of the previous edition, defenders of the title); Ezequiel Cwirkaluk & Bárbara Silenzi; Martín Liberman & Marcela Greco; Pedro Alfonso & Florencia Vigna and Oscar Ruggeri & Candela Ruggeri. Later, one more celebrity couple will join (Anita & Marcos).

On 7 June, Bárbara Vélez, one of the celebrities announced in the program, withdraws for personal reasons from the competition before her debut. On 22 June, before meeting the first eliminated couple, Alejandro Lerner withdrew from the competition for personal reasons. More resignations were presented throughout the program: Fabián Doman, Martín Liberman & Marcela Greco, Fernando Vázquez and Agustín Casanova.

For the first time in the show's history, a celebrity (singer Marta Sánchez) was disqualified for not showing up to dance when she was summoned.

In the third round, the lawyer and television personality Fernanda Herrera joined. Faced with the massive resignations, the production decided to incorporate new couples to the competition (after round 8). The production chose Bárbara Vélez to rejoin the contest, after her scandalous exit from the contest before her debut, and to incorporate Nicole Neumann, Lizy Tagliani, Anita Martínez & Marcos Gómez (winners of Bailando 2014) and Carla Conte (winner of Bailando por un sueño 3).

Subsequently, Vélez withdraws (for the second time) from the competition. It is the first time in the history of Bailando that this happens.

In quotation marks («»), the nicknames.

Judges 
The panel of judges will be made up of five personalities associated with the world of dance, theater, acting, modeling and television. Four of them return from the previous edition: de Brito, Casán, Silveyra and Polino. Ardohaín (who was the winner of the fifth edition) joined the panel as a new judge.

 Ángel de Brito (Journalist & TV and radio host)
 Carolina «Pampita» Ardohaín (Model, actress & former dancer)
 Moria Casán (Actress, former vedette, former dancer & TV personality)
 Soledad Silveyra (Actress)
 Marcelo Polino (Journalist & TV and radio host)

After two seasons, Nacha Guevara did not return as a permanent judge this season, though she did return as a guest judge the several night to replace Ardohaín. Other celebrities who occupied Ardohaín's chair were María Laura «Lolo» Rossi (dancer & choreographer. Also head of choreographers on the show), Florencia de la V (actress, former vedette & TV host) and Mariana «Lali» Espósito (actress, singer-songwriter & dancer).

Other guest judges were Flavio Mendoza (artistic director & choreographer), Graciela Alfano (model, former actress & former vedette) and María Vázquez (model) replacing de Brito, Silveyra and Casán, respectively.

Scoring chart 

Red numbers indicate the lowest score for each style.
Green numbers indicate the highest score for each style.
 Indicates the couple sentenced.
 Indicates the couple was saved by the judges.
 Indicates the couple was saved by the public.
 Indicates the couple eliminated that round.
 Indicates the couple withdrew from the competition.
 Indicates the couple was disqualified by the production.
 Indicates the winning couple.
 Indicates the runner-up couple.
 Indicates the semi-finalists couples.

Notes:
In italics, partial scores without the secret vote.
A: All couples are sent to duel to define the semifinalists.
 "—" indicates the couple(s) did not dance that round.

Rounds 
Individual judges' scores in the charts below (given in parentheses) are listed in this order from left to right: Ángel de Brito, Pampita Ardohaín, Moria Casán, Soledad Silveyra, Marcelo Polino. 
 Secret vote is in bold text.

Round 1: Disco 
Running order

 indicate the lowest score 
 indicate the highest score 
 Sentenced: Julio Iglesias Jr. & Julieta Vaccarelli (20), Pamela Sosa & Alejandro Gallego (21), Charlotte Caniggia & Juan Leandro Nimo (31), Fernando Carrillo & Camila Méndez Ribeiro (31), María del Mar Cuello Molar & Fernando Bertona (31) and Martín Liberman & Marcela Greco (31)
 Saved by the judges: Charlotte Caniggia & Juan Leandro Nimo, Fernando Carrillo & Camila Méndez Ribeiro, Julio Iglesias Jr. & Julieta Vaccarelli and Martín Liberman & Marcela Greco
 Saved by the public: Pamela Sosa & Alejandro Gallego (51.66%)
 Eliminated: María del Mar Cuello Molar & Fernando Bertona (48.34%)
 Withdrew: Bárbara Vélez & Maximiliano Buitrago and Alejandro Lerner & Nina Iraolagoitia

Round 2: Cumbia 
Running order

 indicate the lowest score 
 indicate the highest score 

 Sentenced: Charlotte Caniggia & Juan Leandro Nimo (26), Fabián Domán & Bárbara Reali (26), Julio Iglesias Jr. & Julieta Vaccarelli (26), Pamela Sosa & Alejandro Gallego (26), Miriam Bora & Iván Anríquez (29), Sabrina Rojas & Cristián Ponce (29), Ezequiel Cwirkaluk & Bárbara Silenzi (32) and Iliana Calabró & Fernando Castro (32)
 Saved by the judges: Iliana Calabró & Fernando Castro, Sabrina Rojas & Cristián Ponce, Ezequiel Cwirkaluk & Bárbara Silenzi, Miriam Bora & Iván Anríquez, Charlotte Caniggia & Juan Leandro Nimo and Fabián Domán & Bárbara Reali
 Saved by the public: Pamela Sosa & Alejandro Gallego (51.07%)
 Eliminated: Julio Iglesias Jr. & Julieta Vaccarelli (48.93%)

Round 3: Street pop 
Running order

 indicate the lowest score 
 indicate the highest score 

 Sentenced: Fabián Doman & Bárbara Reali (27), Pamela Sosa & Alejandro Gallego (27), Ezequiel Cwirkaluk & Bárbara Silenzi (29), Fernanda Herrera & Fernando Bertona (29), Iliana Calabró & Fernando Castro (29), Marta Sánchez & Joel Ledesma (29), Oscar Ruggeri & Candela Ruggeri (29), Evander Holyfield & Judith Kovalovsky (33), Fernando Carrillo & Camila Méndez Ribeiro (33), Miriam Bora & Iván Anríquez (33) and  Sabrina Rojas & Cristián Ponce (33)
 Saved by the judges: Iliana Calabró & Fernando Castro, Ezequiel Cwirkaluk & Bárbara Silenzi, Fernando Carrillo & Camila Méndez Ribeiro, Sabrina Rojas & Cristián Ponce, Marta Sánchez & Joel Ledesma, Miriam Bora & Iván Anríquez, Pamela Sosa & Alejandro Gallego and Oscar Ruggeri & Candela Ruggeri
 Saved by the public: Fernanda Herrera & Fernando Bertona (51.52%)
 Eliminated: Evander Holyfield & Judith Kovalovsky (48.48%)
 Withdrew: Fabián Doman & Bárbara Reali

Round 4: Trio salsa 
Running order

 indicate the lowest score 
 indicate the highest score 

 Sentenced: Pamela Sosa & Alejandro Gallego (26), Ángela Torres & Facundo Insúa (29), Fernanda Herrera & Fernando Bertona (29), Agustín Casanova & Josefina Oriozabala (33), Fernando Carrillo & Camila Méndez Ribeiro (33), Marta Sánchez & Joel Ledesma (33), Martín Liberman & Georgina Tirotta (33), Miriam Bora & Iván Anríquez (33) and Sabrina Rojas & Cristián Ponce (33) 
 Saved by the judges: Agustín Casanova & Josefina Oriozabala, Ángela Torres & Facundo Insúa, Sabrina Rojas & Cristián Ponce, Martín Liberman & Georgina Tirotta, Miriam Bora & Iván Anríquez, Fernando Carrillo & Camila Méndez Ribeiro and Fernanda Herrera & Fernando Bertona
 Saved by the public: Marta Sánchez & Joel Ledesma (50.06%)
 Eliminated: Pamela Sosa & Alejandro Gallego (49.94%)

Round 5: Folklore 
Running order

 indicate the lowest score 
 indicate the highest score 

 Sentenced: Ángela Torres & Facundo Insúa (—), Iliana Calabró & Fernando Castro (28), Miriam Bora & Iván Anríquez (28), Diego Maradona, Jr. & Yamila Ramírez (28), Charlotte Caniggia & Juan Leandro Nimo (28), Oscar Ruggeri & Candela Ruggeri (33) and Fernanda Herrera & Fernando Bertona (33)
 Saved by the judges: Iliana Calabró & Fernando Castro, Oscar Ruggeri & Candela Ruggeri, Charlotte Caniggia & Juan Leandro Nimo, Fernanda Herrera & Fernando Bertona and Diego Maradona, Jr. & Yamila Ramírez
 Saved by the public: Ángela Torres & Facundo Insúa (67.15%)
 Eliminated: Miriam Bora & Iván Anríquez (32.85%)
 Disqualified: Marta Sánchez & Joel Ledesma

Round 6: Cuarteto 
Running order

 indicate the lowest score 
 indicate the highest score 

 Sentenced: Ezequiel Cwirkaluk & Bárbara Silenzi (30), Oscar Ruggeri & Candela Ruggeri (30), Charlotte Caniggia & Juan Leandro Nimo (33), Iliana Calabró & Fernando Castro (34) and Fernando Carrillo & Camila Méndez Ribeiro (34)
 Saved by the judges: Iliana Calabró & Fernando Castro, Ezequiel Cwirkaluk & Bárbara Silenzi and Charlotte Caniggia & Juan Leandro Nimo
 Saved by the public: Oscar Ruggeri & Candela Ruggeri (55.61%)
 Eliminated: Fernando Carrillo & Camila Méndez Ribeiro (44.39%)
 Withdrew: Martín Liberman & Georgina Tirotta/Marcela Greco

Round 7: Reggaetón 
Running order

 indicate the lowest score 
 indicate the highest score 

 Sentenced: Charlotte Caniggia & Juan Leandro Nimo (18), Fernanda Herrera & Fernando Bertona (18), Sabrina Rojas & Cristián Ponce (23), Diego Maradona, Jr. & Yamila Ramírez (27), Ernestina Pais & Marcos Beierbach (27) and Oscar Ruggeri & Candela Ruggeri (27)
 Saved by the judges: Sabrina Rojas & Cristián Ponce, Fernanda Herrera & Fernando Bertona, Diego Maradona, Jr. & Yamila Ramírez and Charlotte Caniggia & Juan Leandro Nimo
 Saved by the public: Oscar Ruggeri & Candela Ruggeri (51.21%)
 Eliminated: Ernestina Pais & Marcos Beierbach (48.79%)

Round 8: Free Style 
Running order

 indicate the lowest score 
 indicate the highest score 

 Sentenced: Osvaldo Laport & Macarena Rinaldi (25), Charlotte Caniggia & Juan Leandro Nimo (27), Diego Maradona, Jr. & Yamila Ramírez (32), Federico Bal & Laura Fernández (32), Fernanda Herrera & Fernando Bertona (32) and Sabrina Rojas & Cristián Ponce (32)
 Saved by the judges: Diego Maradona, Jr. & Yamila Ramírez, Federico Bal & Laura Fernández, Osvaldo Laport & Macarena Rinaldi and Sabrina Rojas & Cristián Ponce
 Saved by the public: Charlotte Caniggia & Juan Leandro Nimo (74.30%)
 Eliminated: Fernanda Herrera & Fernando Bertona (25.70%)
 Withdrew: Fernando Vázquez & Estefanía Pais

Round 9: Bachata 
Running order

 indicate the lowest score 
 indicate the highest score 

 Sentenced: Charlotte Caniggia & Juan Leandro Nimo (28), Federico Bal & Laura Fernández (28), Ezequiel Cwirkaluk & Bárbara Silenzi (31), Diego Maradona, Jr. & Yamila Ramírez (32) and Pedro Alfonso & Florencia Vigna (32)
 Saved by the judges: Pedro Alfonso & Florencia Vigna, Federico Bal & Laura Fernández and  Ezequiel Cwirkaluk & Bárbara Silenzi 
 Saved by the public: Charlotte Caniggia & Juan Leandro Nimo (54.81%)
 Eliminated: Diego Maradona, Jr. & Yamila Ramírez (45.19%)
 Withdrew: Agustín Casanova & Josefina Oriozabala

Round 10: Rock and Roll 
Running order

 indicate the lowest score 
 indicate the highest score 

 Sentenced: Ezequiel Cwirkaluk & Bárbara Silenzi (28), Carla Conte & Marcos Beierbach (30), Anita Martínez & Marcos Gómez (34), Lizy Tagliani & Carlos Bernal (34) and Nicole Neumann & Jorge Moliniers (34)
 Saved by the judges: Carla Conte & Marcos Beierbach, Nicole Neumann & Jorge Moliniers and Ezequiel Cwirkaluk & Bárbara Silenzi
 Saved by the public: Anita Martínez & Marcos Gómez (54.81%)
 Eliminated: Lizy Tagliani & Carlos Bernal (45.19%)

Round 11: Synchro dance 
Running order

 indicate the lowest score 
 indicate the highest score 

 Sentenced: Charlotte Caniggia & Juan Leandro Nimo (9), Osvaldo Laport & Macarena Rinaldi (30), Anita Martínez & Marcos Gómez (33) and Iliana Calabró & Fernando Castro (33)
 Saved by the judges: Iliana Calabró & Fernando Castro and Anita Martínez & Marcos Gómez
 Saved by the public: Charlotte Caniggia & Juan Leandro Nimo (55.62%)
 Eliminated: Osvaldo Laport & Macarena Rinaldi (44.38%)

Round 12: Tango or Milonga 
Running order

 indicate the lowest score 
 indicate the highest score 

 Sentenced: Anita Martínez & Marcos Gómez (30), Oscar Ruggeri & Candela Ruggeri (30), Ezequiel Cwirkaluk & Bárbara Silenzi (36), Federico Bal & Laura Fernández (36), Ángela Torres & Facundo Insúa (37) and Bárbara Vélez & Maximiliano Buitrago (37)
 Saved by the judges: Ezequiel Cwirkaluk & Bárbara Silenzi, Bárbara Vélez & Maximiliano Buitrago, Federico Bal & Laura Fernández and Oscar Ruggeri & Candela Ruggeri
 Saved by the public: Ángela Torres & Facundo Insúa (54.47%)
 Eliminated: Anita Martínez & Marcos Gómez (45.53%)

Round 13: Tributes 
Running order

 indicate the lowest score 
 indicate the highest score 

 Sentenced: Charlotte Caniggia & Juan Leandro Nimo (26), Carla Conte & Marcos Beierbach (29), Bárbara Vélez & Maximiliano Buitrago (33), Favio Posca & Soledad Bayona (33), Nicole Neumann & Jorge Moliniers (33) and Sabrina Rojas & Cristián Ponce (33)
 Saved by the judges: Nicole Neumann & Jorge Moliniers, Carla Conte & Marcos Beierbach, Sabrina Rojas & Cristián Ponce and Charlotte Caniggia & Juan Leandro Nimo
 Saved by the public: Bárbara Vélez & Maximiliano Buitrago (51.61%)
 Eliminated: Favio Posca & Soledad Bayona (48.39%)

Round 14: Family's Merengue 
Running order

 indicate the lowest score 
 indicate the highest score 

 Sentenced: Bárbara Vélez & Maximiliano Buitrago (27), Charlotte Caniggia & Juan Leandro Nimo (32), Ezequiel Cwirkaluk & Bárbara Silenzi (40), Iliana Calabró & Fernando Castro (40), Nicole Neumann & Jorge Moliniers (40) and Oscar Ruggeri & Candela Ruggeri (40)
 Saved by the judges: Nicole Neumann & Jorge Moliniers, Iliana Calabró & Fernando Castro, Ezequiel Cwirkaluk & Bárbara Silenzi and Bárbara Vélez & Maximiliano Buitrago
 Saved by the public: Charlotte Caniggia & Juan Leandro Nimo (55.37%)
 Eliminated: Oscar Ruggeri & Candela Ruggeri (44.63%)

Round 15: Zumba 
Running order

 indicate the lowest score 
 indicate the highest score 

 Sentenced: Ezequiel Cwirkaluk & Bárbara Silenzi (30), Iliana Calabró & Fernando Castro (30), Sabrina Rojas & Cristián Ponce (30), María del Cerro & Nicolás Villalba (34), Federico Bal & Laura Fernández (37) and Nicole Neumann & Jorge Moliniers (37)
 Saved by the judges: Federico Bal & Laura Fernández, María del Cerro & Nicolás Villalba, Iliana Calabró & Fernando Castro and Ezequiel Cwirkaluk & Bárbara Silenzi
 Saved by the public: Nicole Neumann & Jorge Moliniers (51.32%)
 Eliminated: Sabrina Rojas & Cristián Ponce (48.68%)

Round 16: Aquadance 
Running order

 indicate the lowest score 
 indicate the highest score 

 Sentenced: Ezequiel Cwirkaluk & Bárbara Silenzi (31), Charlotte Caniggia & Juan Leandro Nimo (35), Iliana Calabró & Fernando Castro (35), Nicole Neumann & Jorge Moliniers (35), Pedro Alfonso & Florencia Vigna (35) and Lizy Tagliani & Marcos Beierbach (39)
 Saved by the judges: Pedro Alfonso & Florencia Vigna, Ezequiel Cwirkaluk & Bárbara Silenzi, Lizy Tagliani & Marcos Beierbach and Nicole Neumann & Jorge Moliniers
 Saved by the public: Charlotte Caniggia & Juan Leandro Nimo (55.54%)
 Eliminated: Iliana Calabró & Fernando Castro (44.46%)
 Withdrew: Bárbara Vélez & Maximiliano Buitrago

Round 17: Trio cha-cha-cha 
Running order

 indicate the lowest score 
 indicate the highest score 

 Sentenced: Ezequiel Cwirkaluk & Bárbara Silenzi (27), Carla Conte & Marcos Beierbach (30), Charlotte Caniggia & Juan Leandro Nimo (43) and María del Cerro & Nicolás Villalba (43)
 Saved by the judges: María del Cerro & Nicolás Villalba and Charlotte Caniggia & Juan Leandro Nimo
 Saved by the public: Ezequiel Cwirkaluk & Bárbara Silenzi (68.91%)
 Eliminated: Carla Conte & Marcos Beierbach (31.09%)

Round 18: Latin pop 

 indicate the lowest score 
 indicate the highest score 

 Sentenced: Ezequiel Cwirkaluk & Bárbara Silenzi (37), Charlotte Caniggia & Juan Leandro Nimo (41), Pedro Alfonso & Florencia Vigna (41), María del Cerro & Nicolás Villalba (44) and Nicole Neumann & Jorge Moliniers (44)
 Saved by the judges: María del Cerro & Nicolás Villalba, Pedro Alfonso & Florencia Vigna and Nicole Neumann & Jorge Moliniers
 Saved by the public: Ezequiel Cwirkaluk & Bárbara Silenzi (50.88%)
 Eliminated: Charlotte Caniggia & Juan Leandro Nimo (49.12%)

Round 19: Free Style II 
Running order

 indicate the lowest score 
 indicate the highest score 

 Sentenced: Nicole Neumann & Jorge Moliniers (37), Ángela Torres & Facundo Insúa (42) and María del Cerro & Nicolás Villalba (44)
 Saved by the judges: María del Cerro & Nicolás Villalba
 Saved by the public: Nicole Neumann & Jorge Moliniers (57.81%)
 Eliminated: Ángela Torres & Facundo Insúa (42.19%)

Round 20: Country 
Running order

 Saved by the judges: Federico Bal & Laura Fernández, María del Cerro & Nicolás Villalba and Pedro Alfonso & Florencia Vigna
 Saved by the public: Ezequiel Cwirkaluk & Bárbara Silenzi (58.12%)
 Eliminated: Nicole Neumann & Jorge Moliniers (41.88%)

Semifinals

1st Semifinal 
Running order

 Finalists: Ezequiel Cwirkaluk & Bárbara Silenzi
 Semifinalists: Federico Bal & Laura Fernández

2nd Semifinal  
Running order

 Finalists: Pedro Alfonso & Florencia Vigna
 Semifinalists: María del Cerro & Nicolás Villalba

Final 
Running order

 Winners: Pedro Alfonso & Florencia Vigna
 Runners-up: Ezequiel Cwirkaluk & Bárbara Silenzi

References

Argentina
Argentine variety television shows
2016 Argentine television seasons